I See You may refer to:

Music

Albums 
 I See You (Gong album), 2014 
 I See You (The xx album), 2017

Songs 
 "I See You" (Chris Tomlin and Brandon Lake song), 2021
 "I See You" (Jutty Ranx song), 2013
 "I See You" (Luke Bryan song), 2014
 "I See You (Theme from Avatar)", 2009, by Leona Lewis
 "I See You", by Bear Hands from You'll Pay for This, 2016
 "I See You", by The Byrds from Fifth Dimension, 1966
 "I See You", by Dirty Projectors from Dirty Projectors (album), 2017
 "I See You", by Idina Menzel from Idina, 2016
 "I See You", by Juliana Hatfield from Hey Babe, 1992
 "I See You", a single by Kristin Amparo, 2015
 "I See You", by Kygo from Kids in Love (album), 2017
 "I See You", by Mika from The Boy Who Knew Too Much, 2009

Film and television 
 I See You (2006 film), a Bollywood romance
 I-See-You.Com, a 2006 comedy film
 "I See You" (Breaking Bad), a 2010 episode of Breaking Bad
 Kita Kita (I See You), a 2017 Philippine romantic comedy film
 I See You (2019 film), an American thriller film

Other uses
iSeeYou, a security bug affecting iSight cameras in some Apple laptops
 I See You, a 2016 novel by Clare Mackintosh

See also 

 ICU (disambiguation)
 See You (disambiguation)
 I Can See You (disambiguation)